Mirzoyan, is an Armenian surname. Notable people with the surname include:
Alexander Mirzayan (born 1945), Russian singer-songwriter
Alexander Mirzoyan (born 1951), Soviet association football player
Arakel Mirzoyan (born 1989), Armenian weightlifter
Ararat Mirzoyan (born 1979), Armenian First Deputy Prime Minister since May 2018
Arayik Mirzoyan (born 1987), Armenian weightlifter
Edvard Mirzoyan (1921–2012), Armenian composer
Karen Mirzoyan, Former Minister of Foreign Affairs (2012–2017) of the Artsakh Republic
Levon Mirzoyan (1897–1939), Soviet statesman
Oksen Mirzoyan (born 1961), Soviet weightlifter
Pharaon Mirzoyan (born 1949), Armenian painter

See also
Mirzoyan–Terdjanian organization, an Armenian-American organized crime group, mastermind of the 2010 Medicaid fraud in the United States 

Armenian-language surnames